Apiothyrium is a genus of fungi in the family Hyponectriaceae.

Species
As accepted by Species Fungorum;
Apiothyrium arcticum 
Apiothyrium tasmanicum

References

External links
Index Fungorum

Xylariales
Taxa named by Franz Petrak